This is a list of supplements for the RuneQuest role-playing game.

RuneQuest first (1978), second (1979), and Classic (2016) editions 

RuneQuest 1 & 2 products and edition by Chaosium:

4001 - RuneQuest 1 softcover Rulebook; Perrin, Steve; Turney, Ray & Friends (Henderson, Steve; James, Warren; editing and special sections: Sapienza, John & Stafford, Greg; Illustrations Perenne (Perrin), Luise; Map Sartar & Prax: Church, William) 120 pages, 1978.
4001 - RuneQuest 2 softcover Rulebook; Perrin, Steve; Turney, Ray & Friends (Henderson, Steve; James, Warren; editing and special sections: Sapienza, John & Stafford, Greg; Illustrations Perenne (Perrin), Luise; Map Sartar & Prax: Church, William) 120 pages, 1979.
4001-X - RuneQuest 2, Boxed; softcover Rulebook, Perrin, Steve; Turney, Ray & Friends (Henderson, Steve; James, Warren; editing and special sections: Sapienza, John & Stafford, Greg; Illustrations Perenne (Perrin), Luise; Map Sartar & Prax: Church, William) 120 pages,. Read This First 1 pages. Basic Role-playing, Stafford, Greg; Willis, Lynn; 16 pages. Apple Lane, scenario, Stafford, Greg; 32 pages. Fangs, Forthoffer, David; 16 pages. 8 pages of characters and monsters; 6 dice; 1980. Licensed edition published in the UK by Games Workshop
4001-H - RuneQuest 2 Hardcover Rulebook, Perrin, Steve; Turney, Ray & Friends (Henderson, Steve; James, Warren; editing and spécial sections: Sapienza, John & Stafford, Greg; Illustrations Perenne (Perrin), Luise; Map Sartar & Prax: Church, William) 120 pages, June 1982.
4002 - Balastor's Barracks; Henderson, Steve; James, Warren; Perrin, Steve; Illustrations Conrad, G.; 24 pages, 1978
4003 - Trolls and Trollkin; Turney, Ray; Illustrations Perenne (Perrin), Luise; 20 pages, 1978
4004 - Creatures of Chaos 1; Turney, Ray; Illustrations Perenne (Perrin), Luise; 20 pages, 1978
4005 - Apple Lane;  32 pages.
4006 - Militia & Mercenaries; Turney, Ray; Illustrations [[Steve Leialoha|Leialoha, Steve 'S.L.''']]; 16 pages, 1979
4007 - Snake Pipe Hollow, RuneQuest Adventures in Caverns of Chaos; Stafford, Greg; Kraft, Rudy; Illustration, Cover: Church, William; Interior Perenne (Perrin); February 1979 second edition Illustration, Cover Sullivan, Tom 1981, 48 pages.
4008 - Cults of Prax; Perrin, Steve; Stafford, Greg; Illustration: cover: Swenston, Steve; Interior: Church, William; Conrad, Guy; Day, Gene; Perenne (Perrin), Luise; Rune: Church, William; 112 pages, May 1979 (Licensed edition published in the UK by Games Workshop cover and Rune Church, William; January 1981).
4009 - Foes; 1200 Monsters of RuneQuest; Forthoffer, David; illustrations Becker, Richard; 112 pages, 1980
4010 - The Gateway Bestiary; Petersen, Sandy; Illustrations: Becker, Richard; 64 pages, June 1980
4011 - Plunder; Kraft, Rudy; Illustration: Becker, Richard; 48 pages, August 1980
4012 - Runemasters; Keyes, William R.; Illustrations Perenne (Perrin), Luise; 48 pages, August 1980
4013 - Griffin Mountain; Jaquays, Paul; Kraft, Rudy; Petersen, Sandy; Perrin, Steve; Stafford, Greg; Illustration Jaquays, Paul; 202 pages, May 1981 (Licensed edition published in the UK by Games Workshop).
4014 - Cults of Terror; Willis, Lynn; Stafford, Greg; Krank, Charlie; Kaufer, Ken; Swenson, Anders; Natzke, John; Petersen, Sandy; Summers, Sean; Jaquays, Paul; Kraft, Rudy; Illustration: Map: Krank, Charlie; Cover Painting: Jaquays, Paul; Interior: Jaquays, Paul; Becker, Richard; 96 pages, May 1981.
4015-X - Borderlands; Boxed; Boyle, John E.; Chodak, Yurek; Fiorito, Tony; Free, Lisa A.; Hoffman, Reid; Kirby, Janet; Kraft, Rudy; Perrin, Steve; Petersen, Sandy; Rolston, Ken; Stafford, Greg; Willis, Lynn; Wolcott, Elizabeth A.; Map: Chodak, Yurek; Church, William; Illustration: Free, Lisa A.; booklet: What's in the box (1 page); Common Knowledge for Players (4 pages); Referee's Handbook (48 pages); Referee's Encounter Book (32 pages); Map of the Raus Domain (22x17), Map of N. & S. River Cradles (11x34); Individual Scenario 1-7: 1 Scouting the Land (4 pages), 2 Outlaw Hunt (6 pages), 3 Jezra's Rescue (8 pages), 4 Revenge of Muriah (8 pages), 5 5-Eyes Temple (20 pages), 6 Condor Crags (6 pages), 7 To Giant Land! (8 pages); April 1982.
4016-X - Troll Pak; Boxed; Perrin, Steve; Petersen, Sandy; Stafford, Greg; Illustration: Cover: Dupont, Don; Interior: Free, Lisa A.; booklet: What's in the box (1 page ); Book One: Uz Lore (64 pages); Book Two: Book of Uz (48 pages); Book Three: Book of Adventures (64 pages); Player Handouts (8 pages); Munchrooms A (12 pages); Munchrooms B (6 pages); Map of Dagori Inkarth, July 1982.
4017 - SoloQuest; LaVergne, Alan; Illustration cover: Becker, Richard; pages 80, June 1982.
4018-X - Questworld; Boxed; Boyle, John E.; Florio, Mark; Goldberg, Ron; Harmon, Mark; Kirby, Janet; LaVergne, Alan; Stafford, Greg; Map: Krank, Charlie; Willis, Lynn; Illustration: Cover: Roland, Mark; Interior: Perenne (Perrin), Luise; booklet: What's in the box (1page); Introduction to Questworld (8 pages); Candlefire (40 pages); Lord Skyppen's Mansion (48 pages); Greenwald Tales (32 pages); Map of Kanos (17x22); Map of Greenwald region (17x22); August 1982.
4019 - SoloQuest 2: Scorpion Hall; LaVergne, Alan; Illustration, Cover: Becker, Richard; 96 pages, July 1982.
4020 - SoloQuest 3: The Snow King's Bride; LaVergne, Alan; Illustrations Perenne (Perrin), Luise; 48 pages, November 1982.
4021-X - Pavis: Threshold to Danger; Boxed; Dickinson, Oliver; Krank, Charlie; Perrin, Steve; Petersen, Sandy; Rolston, Ken; Stafford, Greg; Swenson, Anders; Trout, Michael; Willis, Lynn; Willner, M.B.; Map: Chodak, Yurek; Krank, Charlie; Willis, Lynn; Illustration: Cover: Blum, Michael; Foster, Brad W.; Interior: Blum, Michael; Foster, Brad W.; Perenne (Perrin), Luise; booklet: What's in the box (1 page); Common Knowledge for Players (40 pages); City Guide for the Gamemaster (40 pages); Map of New Pavis (17x22); Episodes for the Gamemaster (40 pages); Map of N. & S. River Cradles (11x34); 1983.
4022-X - Big Rubble: The Deadly City; Boxed; Perrin, Steve; Stafford, Greg et al.; booklet: What's in the box (1 page); Common Knowledge for Players (16 pages); Guide for the Gamemaster (32 pages); Episodes for the Gamemaster (96 pages); Map of Big Rubble (11x34); 1983.
4023 - RuneQuest Companion; Johnson, Bill; Kahn, Sherman; LaVergne, Alan; McCormick, Jim; Nance, Ron; Petersen, Sandy; Stafford, Greg; Cartes: Krank, Charlie; Illustration: Cover: Becker, Richard; Interior: Becker, Richard; Church, William; Day, Gene; Ramos, James Kevin; Swenston, Steve; 72 pages, 1983.
4500 - King of Sartar; Book by Stafford, Greg; 285 pages, 1992
4501 - Wyrms Footprints, Glorantha Legends and Lore by Stafford, Greg; Stafford, Greg; Hargrave, David A.; Johnson, Bill; Krank, Charlie; Illustration: Cover: Barker, Dan; Interior: Church, William; Horsley, Ralph 'RCH'; Roland, Mark; Swenston, Steve; 112 pages, June 1995
XXXX - The Sea Cave, scenario, Stafford, Greg; Illustrations Jaquays, Jennell; 24 pages, 1980 (published in 2016)

 Avalon Hill third edition 
 AH857 - RuneQuest Fantasy Roleplaying Adventure, Deluxe Edition, 

Boxed Supplements
The boxed supplements each contained a number (usually three) paper covered books.
 AH8573 - Monster Coliseum Avalon Hill: RuneQuest 3 (1985 Box)
 AH8574 - Adventurer Sheets: Human Avalon Hill: RuneQuest 3 (1985 Box)
 AH8575 - Adventurer Sheets: Nonhuman Avalon Hill: RuneQuest 3 (1985 Box)
 AH8576 - Vikings, Nordic Roleplaying for RuneQuest. Boxed set 4, 
 AH8577 - Gods of Glorantha, 60 Religions for RuneQuest. boxed set 5, 
 AH8578 - Griffin Island  Partial reworking of the Griffin Mountain book published for RQ2.
 AH8584 - Land of Ninja 
 AH8585 - Glorantha: Genertela, Crucible of the Hero Wars 
 AH8586 - Trollpak (Second edition)   Largely reprinting the RQ2 Trollpak box, but without the bulk of the adventures or cults, both of which would be spun off into separate products. 
 AH8587 - Troll Gods  Mainly derived from RQ2 Tollpak, but with some new material.
 AH8588 - Elder Secrets of Glorantha  Overview of non-human races of Glorantha. Derives some material from Trollpak, but much new content.

Softback books
The softback books were generally saddle stitched, though some were prefect bound. All had cardboard covers. 
 AH85712 - Apple Lane   A reissue of the RQ2 adventure.
 AH85713 - Snake Pipe Hollow  A reissue of the RQ2 adventure.
 AH85711 - Gloranthan Bestiary 
 AH85714 - RuneQuest Cities 
 AH85715 - Into the Troll Realms, Troll Adventures and Encounters for RuneQuest,  A reprint of the shorter adventures contained in the first edition Trollpak box. 
 AH85716 - The Haunted Ruins  A reprint of a longer adventure from the first edition of Trollpak. 
 AH85717 - Daughters of Darkness and the Chronicles of Santon , Adventures in an original setting.
 AH8589 - Eldarad: The Lost City,  An original adventure setting.
 AH8590 - Sun County 
 AH8591 - River of Cradles  A mix of new material and work taken from the RQ2 Pavis and Big Rubble boxes.
 AH8592 - Dorastor: Land of Doom, 
 AH8594 - Shadows on the Borderland 
 AH8593 - Strangers in Prax 
 AH8595 - Lords of Terror  Draws from and expands the RQ2 book Cults of Terror.

 Games Workshop third edition 
The Games Workshop supplements were hardback books converted from the Avalon Hill boxed sets.

GW4667 - RuneQuest Monsters, 3rd Volume 
GW4655 - Land of Ninja, 4th Volume  Reprint of the Avalon Hill boxed set.

Mongoose RuneQuest 4th and 5th Editions
There were an extensive number of MRQ supplements, generally published as hardback books. The bulk are set in the second age of Glorantha.

The Design Mechanism RuneQuest 6th edition
In 2012 RuneQuest 6th edition was written and published by The Design Mechanism. In 2015 the RuneQuest licence reverted to Chaosium. In 2016 RuneQuest 6 was re-branded and re-published by The Design Mechanism as Mythras.
RuneQuest 6th edition and its supplements supplements are available as Mythras editions after 2016.

RuneQuest: Roleplaying in Glorantha
Supplements for RQG are generally hardcover books

4027 RuneQuest Quickstart 

4028 RuneQuest - Roleplaying in Glorantha 

4029 Gamemaster Screen Pack -  Screen plus adventure/setting book.

4032 Glorantha Bestiary - 

4034 The Red Book of Magic -  Grimoire.

4035 RuneQuest Starter Set -  Boxed set containing four paper covered books, maps, character sheets and play aids.

4036 Weapons and Equipment - 

4038 The Pegasus Plateau & Other Stories -  Six ready to run adventures.

4039 The Smoking Ruin & Other Stories -  Six ready to run adventures.

As well as the official books listed above there is an active fan publishing scheme known as the Jonstown Compendium'' and published through DriveThruRPG. By March 2022 there were over 200 such publications, some of which were available as Print On Demand hard copies.

Books by third party publishers

Judges Guild
Broken Tree Inn
City of Lei Tabor
Duck Pond
Hellpits of Nightfang
Legendary Duck Tower

References

Lists about role-playing games
RuneQuest
RuneQuest 2nd edition supplements